Jalāl al-Dawla Mu'izz al-Dunyā Wa'l-Din Abu'l-Fatḥ ibn Alp Arslān (16 August 1055 – 19 November 1092,), better known by his regnal name of Malik-Shah I, was the third sultan of the Great Seljuk Empire from 1072 to 1092, under whom the sultanate reached its zenith of power and influence.

During his youth, he spent his time participating in the campaigns of his father Alp Arslan, along with the latters vizier Nizam al-Mulk. During one of such campaigns in 1072, Alp Arslan was fatally wounded and died only a few days later. After that, Malik-Shah was crowned as the new sultan of the empire, but the succession was contested by his uncle Qavurt. Although Malik-Shah was the nominal head of the Seljuk state, Nizam al-Mulk held near absolute power during his reign. Malik-Shah spent the rest of his reign waging war against the Karakhanids on the eastern side, and establishing order in the Caucasus.

Malik-Shah's death to this day remains under dispute; according to some scholars, he was poisoned by Abbasid caliph al-Muqtadi, while others say that he was poisoned by the supporters of Nizam al-Mulk.

Etymology 
Although he was known by several names, he was mostly known as "Malik-Shah", a combination of the Arabic word malik (king) and the Persian word shah (which also means king).

Early life 
Malik-Shah was born on 16 August 1055 and spent his youth in Isfahan. According to the 12th-century Persian historian Muhammad bin Ali Rawandi, Malik-Shah had fair skin, was tall and somewhat bulky. In 1064, Malik-Shah, only 9 years old by then, along with Nizam al-Mulk, the Persian vizier of the Empire, took part in Alp Arslan’s campaign in the Caucasus. The same year, Malik-Shah was married to Terken Khatun, the daughter of the Karakhanid khan Ibrahim Tamghach-Khan. In 1066, Alp Arslan arranged a ceremony near Merv, where he appointed Malik-Shah as his heir and also granted him Isfahan as a fief.

In 1071, Malik-Shah took part in the Syrian campaign of his father, and stayed in Aleppo when his father fought the Byzantine emperor Romanos IV Diogenes at Manzikert. In 1072, Malik-Shah and Nizam al-Mulk accompanied Alp-Arslan during his campaign in Transoxiana against the Karakhanids. However, Alp-Arslan was badly wounded during his expedition, and Malik-Shah shortly took over the army. Alp-Arslan died some days later, and Malik-Shah was declared as the new sultan of the empire.

Reign

War of succession 
However, right after Malik-Shah's accession, his uncle Qavurt claimed the throne for himself and sent Malik-Shah a message which said: "I am the eldest brother, and you are a youthful son; I have the greater right to my brother Alp-Arslan's inheritance." Malik-Shah then replied by sending the following message: "A brother does not inherit when there is a son." This message enraged Qavurt, who thereafter occupied Isfahan. In 1073 a battle took place near Hamadan, which lasted three days. Qavurt was accompanied by his seven sons, and his army consisted of Turkmens, while the army of Malik-Shah consisted of ghulams ("military slaves") and contingents of Kurdish and Arab troops.

During the battle, the Turks of Malik-Shah's army mutinied against him, but he nevertheless managed to defeat and capture Qavurt. Qavurt then begged for mercy and in return promised to retire to Oman. However, Nizam al-Mulk declined the offer, claiming that sparing him was an indication of weakness. After some time, Qavurt was strangled to death with a bowstring, while two of his sons were blinded. After having dealt with that problem, Malik-Shah appointed Qutlugh-Tegin as the governor of Fars and Sav-Tegin as the governor of Kerman.

Warfare with Karakhanids 
Malik-Shah then turned his attention towards the Karakhanids, who had after the death of Alp-Arslan invaded Tukharistan, which was ruled by Malik-Shah's brother Ayaz, who was unable to repel the Karakhanids and was killed by them. Malik-Shah eventually managed to repel the Karakhanids and captured Tirmidh, giving Sav-Tegin the key of the city. Malik-Shah then appointed his other brother Shihab al-Din Tekish as the ruler of Tukharistan and Balkh. During the same period, the Ghaznavid ruler Ibrahim was seizing Seljuk territory in northern Khorasan, but was defeated by Malik-Shah, who then made peace with the latter and gave his daughter Gawhar Khatun in marriage to Ibrahim's son Mas'ud III.

Other wars 
In 1074, Malik-Shah ordered the Turkic warlord Arghar to restore what he had destroyed during his raids in the territory of the Shirvanshah Fariburz I. During the same year, he appointed Qavurt's son Rukn al-Dawla Sultan-Shah as the ruler of Kerman. One year later, Malik-Shah sent an army under Sav-Tegin to Arran, which was ruled by the Shaddadid ruler Fadlun III. Sav-Tegin managed to easily conquer the region, thus ending Shaddadid rule. Malik-Shah then gave Gorgan to Fadlun III as a fief. Throughout Malik's reign new institutions of learning were established and it was during this time that the Jalali calendar was reformed at the Isfahan observatory. In 1086–87, he led an expedition to capture Edessa, Manbij, Aleppo, Antioch and Latakia.  During this expedition, he appointed Aq Sunqur governor of Aleppo and received homage of the Arab emir of Shaizar, Nasir ibn Ali ibn Munquidh. In 1089, Malik-Shah captured Samarkand with the support of the local clergy, and imprisoned its Karakhanid ruler Ahmad Khan ibn Khizr, who was the nephew of Terken Khatun. He then marched to Semirechye, and made the Karakhanid Harun Khan ibn Sulayman, the ruler of Kashgar and Khotan, acknowledge him as his suzerain.

Domestic policy and Ismailis 

In 1092, Nizam al-Mulk was assassinated near Sihna, on the road to Baghdad, by a man disguised as a Sufi. As the assassin was immediately cut down by Nizam's bodyguard, it became impossible to establish with certainty who had sent him. One theory had it that he was an Assassin, since these regularly made attempts on the lives of Seljuk officials and rulers during the 11th century. Another theory had it that the attack had been instigated by Malik-Shah, who may have grown tired of his overmighty vizier. After Nizam al-Mulk's death, Malik-Shah appointed another Persian named Taj al-Mulk Abu'l Ghana'im as his vizier. Malik-Shah then went to Baghdad and decided to depose al-Muqtadi and sent him the following message: "You must relinquish Baghdad to me, and depart to any land you choose." This was because Malik-Shah wanted to appoint his grandson (or nephew) Ja'far as the new caliph.

As Sunni Muslims, the Sultan persecuted Shiites, in particular, the Ismailis of Hassan ibn Sabbah. Followers of Sabbah managed to occupy the Alamut fortress near Qazvin, and the army under the command of the emir Arslan-Tash, sent by Malik Shah, could not recapture it. The Sultan's ghilman, Kizil Sarug, besieged the Daru fortress in Kuhistan, but ceased hostilities in connection with the death of Malik Shah on November 19, 1092, possibly due to poisoning.

Death and aftermath 
Malik-Shah died on 19 November 1092 while he was hunting. He was most likely poisoned by the caliph or the supporters of Nizam al-Mulk. Under the orders of Terken Khatun, Malik-Shah's body was taken back to Isfahan, where it was buried in a madrasa.

Upon his death, the Seljuk Empire fell into chaos, as rival successors and regional governors carved up their empire and waged war against each other. The situation within the Seljuk lands was further complicated by the beginning of the First Crusade, which detached large portions of Syria and Palestine from Muslim control in 1098 and 1099. The success of the First Crusade is at least in part attributable to the political confusion which resulted from Malik-Shah's death.

Family
One of his wives was Terken Khatun. She was the daughter of Tamghach Khan Ibrahim. She was born in 1053. They married in 1065. She had five sons, Dawud, who died in 1082, Ahmed, who died in 1088–9, aged eleven, Sultan Mahmud I, born in 1087–8, Abu'l-Qasim, who died in childhood, and another son who died in childhood, and was buried in Ray. She died in 1094. Another of his wives was Zubayda Khatun. She was born in 1056. She was the daughter of Yaquti, and the granddaughter of Chaghri Beg. She was the mother of Malik-Shah's eldest son, Sultan Barkiyaruq. She died in 1099. One of his concubines was Taj al-Din Khatun Safariyya, also known as Bushali. She was the mother of Sultans Muhammad Tapar and Ahmad Sanjar, and another son who died in childhood, and was buried in Ray. She died in Merv in 1121.

Two other sons, whose mothers are unknown were Tughril and Amir Khumarin, who was born with white hairs over his body and white eyelashes. One of his daughters, Mah-i Mulk Khatun, whose mother was Terken Khatun, married Abbasid Caliph Al-Muqtadi in 1082. Another daughter, Sitara Khatun, was married to Garshasp II, son of Ali ibn Faramurz. Another daughter married Najm al-Daula, son of Shahriyar ibn Qarin. Another daughter was married by Sanjar to the Ispahbud Taj al-Multk Mardavij, son of Ali ibn Mardavij. Another daughter, Terken Khatun, was married to the Kara-Khanid Muhammad Arslan Khan. Their son Rukn al-Din Mahmud Khan, succeeded Sanjar in Khurasan. Another daughter, Gawhar Khatun, was married to Mas'ud III of Ghazni. Another daughter, Ismah Khatun, married Abbasid Caliph Al-Mustazhir in 1109.

Legacy
The 18th century English historian Edward Gibbon wrote of him:

Personality
Malik-Shah displayed substantial interest in science, art and literature. The Isfahan Observatory or Malikshah Observatory was constructed during his reign, closing shortly after his death in 1092. It was from the work at the observatory that the Jalali Calendar was adopted. He thought highly of the art of architecture as well, as he enjoyed building new and splendid mosques in his capital, Isfahan. He was religiously tolerant which is supported by the fact that during his reign, subjects of the Seljuk Empire enjoyed internal peace and religious tolerance. Malik-Shah also showed lenience towards exquisite poetry as his reign is also memorable for the poetry of Omar Khayyam.

Despite being arguably the most powerful monarch of his era, it is believed that Malik-Shah was unpretentious and modest. The legend has it that during the years that were hugely successful for Seljuks on all fronts, Malik-Shah, overwhelmed by the imperial might of his dynasty, used to climb to the top of a hill and say the following: "Oh Almighty God, I will somehow cope with the problem of hunger, please save me from the threat of abundance".

Malik Shah did not spend as much time on campaign as his prominent predecessor Tughril or his father Alp Arslan did. Isfahan became securely established as his chief city of residence, although in the latter years of his rule Malik Shah preferred to winter in Baghdad. Whereas Alp Arslan had spent just over a year out of his decade-long reign in Isfahan, Malik Shah resided there for more than half of his rule. Isfahan also served as the burial site of Malik Shah, his descendants, as well as celebrated bureaucrats of the sultanate like Nizam al-Mulk. Malik Shah’s decision of residing in a capital far away from the centers of Turkmen settlement around Merv, Rayy, Hamadan, and  Azerbaijan could well be explained by the increasing distance between him and his nomadic subjects.

References

Sources 
 
 

 
 
 
 

 
 

Seljuk rulers
1055 births
1092 deaths
11th-century Turkic people
People of the Nizari–Seljuk wars